Bernard Philip Ofner (October 20, 1913 – August 17, 1982), better known by his stage name Barney Phillips, was an American film, television, and radio actor. His most prominent roles include that of Sgt. Ed Jacobs on the 1950s Dragnet television series, appearances in the 1960s on The Twilight Zone, in which he played a Venusian living under cover on Earth in "Will the Real Martian Please Stand Up?", and a supporting role as actor Fletcher Huff in the short-lived 1970s CBS series, The Betty White Show.

Biography and career
He was born in St Louis, Missouri, to Harry Nathan Ofner, a commercial salesman for the leather industry, and Leona (Frank) Ofner, a naturalized citizen of German origin, who went by the nickname Lonnie. He grew up and was educated in St. Louis, then moved to Los Angeles after he graduated from college in 1935.

Interested in acting, he got a small part in an independently produced Grade-B Western called Black Aces in 1937, but his show business career then languished. In 1940, he was in Meet the People on Broadway.

Phillips enlisted in the United States Army in July 1941, serving in the signal corps during World War II.

Following the war, Phillips procured small parts in several films during 1949–1952, before getting a regular role on the NBC television version of Jack Webb's Dragnet, as Sgt. Jacobs. He also voiced the recurring role of Hamilton J. Finger, a police sergeant in Frank Sinatra's radio program Rocky Fortune in 1953 and 1954. Thereafter, he was a prolific character actor in both films and television series throughout the 1950s and 1960s.  In 1955, he played Mr. Jamison in the I Love Lucy episode "Ricky's European Booking."  He also played minor roles in two episodes of Perry Mason, including Mr. Johnson in "The Case of the Wintry Wife" in 1961. In the 1959-60 television season, Phillips portrayed police Lieutenant Geller in the syndicated crime drama Johnny Midnight, starring Edmond O'Brien as a New York City actor-turned-private detective. The following season, Phillips appeared as another police lieutenant, named "Avery," in seven episodes of the syndicated crime drama The Brothers Brannagan, starring Stephen Dunne and Mark Roberts.

In 1959 he had a steady role on Gunsmoke as Long Branch Salon Co-Owner Bill Pence.

In 1962, Phillips was cast as the historical General Winfield Scott Hancock in the episode "The Truth Teller" of the syndicated anthology series Death Valley Days, hosted by Stanley Andrews. The episode focuses on the negotiations leading to the Medicine Lodge Treaty of 1867. Ed Kemmer appeared as investigative reporter Henry Morton Stanley, who assesses Hancock's success in avoiding war on the frontier. Charles Carlson, who had a limited acting career from 1960 to 1967, was cast as Wild Bill Hickok.

Phillips remained active in television through the 1970s until his death in 1982. He was generally a guest star or featured player (e.g. a one-time appearance as an escaped criminal on the Andy Griffith Show); but he did have a number of recurring character roles in television, as series regular "Doc" Kaiser in Twelve O'Clock High (1964–1967), and as a regular on The Betty White Show (1977–1978). However, his best known role is likely to be as a diner counterman who is revealed to be a three-eyed extraterrestrial  in "Will the Real Martian Please Stand Up?", a 1961 episode of The Twilight Zone.

Among many other appearances, Phillips can be seen briefly in Stan Freberg's  Jeno's pizza roll commercial.

Death
Phillips died of cancer at the age of 68 at the Cedars-Sinai Medical Center in Los Angeles.

Partial filmography

Selection of television credits
 Dragnet: (1952) ...series regular as Sergeant Ed Jacobs
 I Love Lucy: "Ricky's European Booking" (1955) ...as Mr. Jamison
 Gunsmoke: "The Roundup" (1956) ...as Mr. Summers
 The Adventures of Ozzie and Harriet: (1957–1958) ...as various characters
 Peter Gunn: "The Blind Pianist" (1958) ...as Stephen Ware
 Gunsmoke: "Renegade White" (1959) ...as Ord Spicer
 Have Gun Will Travel: "The Monster of Moon Ridge" (1959) ...as Dan Bella
 Have Gun Will Travel: "The Shooting of Jessie May" (1960) ... as Joseph Ergo
 Gunsmoke: "Don Matteo" (1960)...as Long Branch Salon Co-Owner Bill Pence
 Hawaiian Eye: "I Wed Three Wives" (1960) ...as Henry Bunker
 The Twilight Zone: "The Purple Testament" (1960) ...as Captain E. L. Gunther
 The Twilight Zone: "A Thing about Machines" (1960) ...as television repairman
 The Twilight Zone: "Will the Real Martian Please Stand Up?" (1961) ...as Haley, the short-order cook
 The Twilight Zone: "Miniature" (1963) ...as Diemel
 The Andy Griffith Show: "Barney Gets His Man" (1961) ...as Eddie Brooke, escaped convict
 The Dick Van Dyke Show: "The Cat Burglar" (1962) ...as Westchester police lieutenant
 Alfred Hitchcock Presents: "Starring the Defense" (1963) ...as Hanley
 Gunsmoke: "Carter Caper" (1963) ...as Smith
 "Alfred Hitchcock Hour": "Who Needs an Enemy?" (1964) ...as The 1st Detective
 Twelve O'Clock High: (1964-1967) ...Major "Doc" Kaiser
 The Invaders: (1967) ...Episodes Task Force (Emmett Morgan), Quantity: Unknown (Walt Anson)
 Shazzan!: (1967-1969) ...voice of Shazzan for all 36 episodes of animated series
 The Three Musketeers:  (1968-1969) ...voice of Porthos for all 18 episodes of animated series
 Get Smart: "Greer Window" (1969) ...as Otto Greer
 Adam-12:  "Log 93: Once a Junkie" (1969) ...as Sergeant Burdick
 Columbo "Suitable For Framing" (1971) ...as Captain Wyler
 The Funky Phantom (1971) ...as Additional voices
 Hawaii Five-O   "Air Cargo… Dial for Murder" (1971) ...co-starring as Arnold Cook
 Cannon: (1971–1974) ...as various characters
 The Betty White Show (1977) ...actor playing Police Chief Fletcher Huff and his "twin" brother
 The Dukes of Hazzard (1979-1985) ...as Judge Buford Potts

References

External links

1913 births
1982 deaths
American male film actors
American male television actors
American male radio actors
American male voice actors
Male actors from St. Louis
Military personnel from St. Louis
American people of German descent
20th-century American male actors
Male actors from Los Angeles
Deaths from cancer in California
United States Army personnel of World War II
United States Army soldiers